Crepaldi is an Italian surname. Notable people with the surname include:

Filippo Crepaldi (born 1992), Italian baseball player
Giampaolo Crepaldi (born 1947), Italian Roman Catholic bishop
Gianni Crepaldi
Mirko Crepaldi
Ottavio Crepaldi

Italian-language surnames